Love at First Flight may refer to:
 Love at First Flight, 1943 novel by Charles F. Spalding and Otis Carney
 "Love at First Flight", a 2002 episode of the cartoon series Time Squad

See also
 Love at First Fight